Steve Pendleton (September 16, 1908 – October 3, 1984) was an American film and television actor. He also went by Gaylord Pendleton as a Broadway performer. He was in more than 220 different films and television episodes. Pendleton appeared in films and on television alongside Roy Rogers, John Wayne, and Gene Autry.

Biography

Selected filmography
He appeared in more than 150 films between 1923 and 1960, including: 

 Manslaughter (1930)
 Seas Beneath (1931)
 The Last Parade (1931)
 Unknown Valley (1933)
 Love Past Thirty (1934)
 The Judgement Book (1935)
 Trails End (1935)
 The Informer (1935)
 The Duke of West Point (1938)
 Enemy Agent (1940)
 Men of the Timberland (1941)
 Eyes of the Underworld (1942)
 Roll, Thunder, Roll! (1949)
 Ride, Ryder, Ride! (1949)
 The Blazing Trail (1949)
 Rio Grande (1950)
 Gunfire (1950)
 When the Redskins Rode (1951)
 Jack Slade (1953)
 Killers from Space (1954)
 Official Detective series Episode: "The Jailhouse Gang" as Aldworth
 I Married a Woman (1958)
 Once Upon a Horse... (1958)
 Tora! Tora! Tora! (1970) - Destroyer Captain (uncredited)

References

External links

1908 births
1984 deaths
Male actors from New York (state)
American male film actors
People from Greater Los Angeles
20th-century American male actors